Aberdeen Central (Gaelic: Obar Dheathain Meadhain) is a burgh constituency of the Scottish Parliament (Holyrood) covering part of the council area of Aberdeen City. It elects one Member of the Scottish Parliament (MSP) by the first past the post method of election. It is one of the ten constituencies in the North East Scotland electoral region, which elects seven additional members, in addition to ten constituency MSPs, to produce a form of proportional representation for the region as a whole.

The seat has been held by Kevin Stewart of the Scottish National Party since the 2011 Scottish Parliament election.

Electoral region

The other nine constituencies of the North East Scotland region are: Aberdeen Donside, Aberdeen South and North Kincardine, Aberdeenshire East, Aberdeenshire West, Angus North and Mearns, Angus South, Banffshire and Buchan Coast, Dundee City East and Dundee City West.

The region covers all of the Aberdeen City council area, the Aberdeenshire council area, the Angus council area, the Dundee City council area and part of the Moray council area.

Constituency boundaries and council area 

The Aberdeen Central constituency was created at the same time as the Scottish Parliament, in 1999, with the name and boundaries of an existing Westminster constituency. In 2005, however, the Westminster constituency was abolished.

Following their First Periodic review of parliamentary constituencies to the Scottish Parliament, the Boundary Commission for Scotland created three newly shaped seats for the Aberdeen City council area. The current constituency is within the Aberdeen City council area, which is divided between three constituencies: Aberdeen Central, Aberdeen Donside and Aberdeen South and North Kincardine. Central and Donside are entirely within the city area, while South and North Kincardine also takes in North Kincardine in the Aberdeenshire council area.

In forming the new Aberdeen Central, the electoral wards used are:
In full: 
Tillydrone/Seaton/Old Aberdeen
Midstocket/Rosemount
George Street/Harbour
In part:
Hilton/Woodside/Stockethill (shared with Aberdeen Donside)
Hazlehead/Ashley/Queens Cross
Airyhall/Broomhill/Garthdee
Torry/Ferryhill (shared with Aberdeen South and North Kincardine)

Member of the Scottish Parliament

Election results

2020s

2010s

2000s

1990s

See also
 Aberdeen City Youth Council

References

External links

Politics of Aberdeen
Constituencies of the Scottish Parliament
1999 establishments in Scotland
Constituencies established in 1999
Scottish Parliament constituencies and regions 1999–2011
Scottish Parliament constituencies and regions from 2011